Adrien Garel  (born 12 March 1996) is a French road and track cyclist who currently rides for French amateur team Sojasun Espoir–ACNC. He won the bronze medal at the 2016–17 UCI Track Cycling World Cup, Round 2 in Apeldoorn in the team pursuit.

Major results
2019
 10th Polynormande

References

External links

1996 births
Living people
French male cyclists
French track cyclists
People from Bagneux, Hauts-de-Seine